Switzerland has participated in the Eurovision Song Contest 62 times since making its debut at the first contest in , missing only four contests, in 1995, 1999, 2001 and 2003. Switzerland hosted the first contest in 1956 in Lugano, and won it. Switzerland won the contest again in 1988, with the  contest being held in Lausanne.

Lys Assia won the first contest in 1956 with the song "Refrain".

Since the introduction of the qualifying round in 1993, Switzerland has entered the top ten only four times. Since the introduction of the semi-final round in 2004, Switzerland have failed to reach the final in 11 of 19 contests, including finishing in last place in the semi-final on 4 occasions. They have also finished in last place in the semi final 4 times since their introduction in 2004, with Piero & The Music Stars (2004), Michael von der Heide (2010), Mélanie René (2015) and Rykka (2016).

Absences 
Switzerland had been absent from Eurovision four times since their participation began in the first contest. These absences, in 1995, 1999, 2001 and 2003 were caused by poor results in previous contests that led to relegation.

National selections 

A mix of different selection processes have been used to determine Switzerland's entry in each year's contest. Since 2019, SRG SSR has used an internal selection process, although televised national finals were used in previous years, held under various names including Concours Eurovision from the 1950s to 2000s, and Die Grosse Entscheidungsshow between 2011 and 2018. In the 1980s, the Swiss national finals tended to have ten participating songs each year: three in French, three in German, three in Italian and one in Romansch.

Participation overview 
Switzerland has four official languages, French, German, Italian, and Romansh. For decades, the song requirements stated that the song had to be performed in a national language, which gave Switzerland leeway as they could perform in any of the four languages. Out of their 60 appearances in the contest, Switzerland has sent 61 songs, 24 of which were in French, 12 in German, 15 in English, 10 in Italian and 1 in Romansh. Both of Switzerland's winning songs have been sung in French.

Congratulations: 50 Years of the Eurovision Song Contest

Hostings

Awards

Marcel Bezençon Awards

Related involvement

Conductors

Commentators and spokespersons

Over the years Switzerland has broadcast the Eurovision Song Contest on three television stations, SRF (German language), RTS (French language) and RSI (Italian language).

Gallery

See also
Switzerland in the Junior Eurovision Song Contest – Junior version of the Eurovision Song Contest.
Switzerland in the Eurovision Dance Contest – Dance version of the Eurovision Song Contest.
Switzerland in the Eurovision Young Dancers – A competition organised by the EBU for younger dancers aged between 16 and 21.
Switzerland in the Eurovision Young Musicians – A competition organised by the EBU for musicians aged 18 years and younger.

Notes

References

External links
 Points to and from Switzerland eurovisioncovers.co.uk

 
Countries in the Eurovision Song Contest